Boris Kandov is the President of the Bukharian Jewish Congress in the United States and Canada.

References

Bukharan Jews
Living people
Year of birth missing (living people)
Place of birth missing (living people)